The Finstergrund Pit near Wieden in the Black Forest in Germany is an abandoned medieval silver and lead mine that was also used in the modern era to extract fluorite and baryte. Since 1982 it has been used as a visitor mine.

Geology 
The most important lodes in the region around Wieden are the fluorite-barite lodes known as Tannenboden, Anton, Werner II, Hoffnung and Finstergrund, which all run in a north to south direction. The latter is 3.5 km long and the most significant hydrothermal lode in the area. The visitor mine (Gallery 5) runs along this lode for 430 metres. Its thickness varies between a few centimetres and 4 metres. About 1 metre was mined.
The ore deposit is a hydrothermal fluorspar-baryte lode, in places containing rich sulfide ores. The country rock is formed by paragneisses and migmatite.

See also 
 List of show mines

References

Literature
 Wolfgang Werner, Volker Dennert: Lagerstätten und Bergbau im Schwarzwald. Herausgabe durch Landesamt für Geologie, Rohstoffe und Bergbau, Baden-Württemberg, Freiburg im Breisgau, 2004, .

External links 
 Visitor mine of Finstergrund Pit
 Photographs from the Finstergrund Mine

Show mines
Silver mines in Germany
Former mines in Germany
Tourist attractions in Baden-Württemberg
Black Forest